"The High and the Mighty" is a song by American rock musician Donnie Iris and is the title track to his 1982 album, The High and the Mighty. The song was released as a single the same year and reached #39 on the U.S. Billboard Mainstream Rock Tracks chart.

Charts

1982 singles
Donnie Iris songs
Songs written by Mark Avsec
Songs written by Donnie Iris
Songs written by Marty Lee Hoenes
1982 songs
Songs written by Albritton McClain
MCA Records singles